Opařany is a municipality and village in Tábor District in the South Bohemian Region of the Czech Republic. It has about 1,400 inhabitants.

Administrative parts
Villages of Hodušín, Nové Dvory, Olší, Oltyně, Podboří and Skrýchov u Opařan are administrative parts of Opařany.

Geography
It lies in the Tábor Uplands. There are several fish ponds in the municipal territory, the largest of them is Oltyňský.

History
The first written mention of Opařany is from 1268, when King Ottokar II of Bohemia bought Opařany together with the brewery. From 1437 to 1547, it was property of the town of Tábor. The Thirty Years' War affected the village, the population declined and the buildings fell into disrepair.

In the early 18th century, the Jesuits acquired Opařany. After canceling the Jesuits' order in 1773, their properties were acquired by a study fund, and in 1825 the manor was gained by the Paar noble family.

Sport
In Opařany is annually held motorcycle cross country race called Enduro.

Sights

In 1727, the Jesuits built a baroque residence with the Church of Saint Francis Xavier as a resemblance to the church in Prague Clementinum. Its interior belongs to one of the most interesting work of art in central Europe. As an author of the project of the church was authorized Kilian Ignaz Dientzenhofer. Since 1923, the building of Pařany Castle has served as a children psychiatric hospital.

In Oltyně part of Opařany there is the Oltyně Castle. It was built in the Neorenaissance style in 1859 on the site of an old fortress. Its part is a  large English park.

References

External links

Villages in Tábor District